The Bottom Deep is the fourth studio album recorded by Norwegian progressive metal band Communic. It was released on 22 July 2011 through Nuclear Blast records.

Track listing

Personnel
Communic
Oddleif Stensland - Lead vocals, Guitar
Tor Alte Andersen - Drums
Erik Mortensen - Bass

References

2011 albums
Communic albums
Albums with cover art by Eliran Kantor